Uwe Erkenbrecher (born 14 November 1954) is a German football manager and a former player who is the current manager of MTV Gifhorn.

References

External links
 

1954 births
Living people
People from Delmenhorst
Footballers from Lower Saxony
German footballers
Association football midfielders
Bundesliga players
2. Bundesliga players
2. Bundesliga managers
Atlas Delmenhorst players
SV Werder Bremen players
SG Wattenscheid 09 players
SC Paderborn 07 players
SV Lippstadt 08 players
German football managers
VfL Wolfsburg managers
VfB Lübeck managers
SpVgg Greuther Fürth managers
FC Carl Zeiss Jena managers
Rot-Weiss Essen managers
SC Paderborn 07 managers
SSV Reutlingen 05 managers
German expatriate football managers
German expatriate sportspeople in Indonesia
Expatriate football managers in Indonesia
Expatriate football managers in Estonia
West German footballers